Charles Trumbo Henry (1902–1964) was an American artist. His mural Northern Georgia (1939), an oil on canvas, was painted for the United States Post Office in Cornelia, Georgia, in a Treasury Department art program. He was born in Niagara Falls, New York. His works are held in the collections of the Brooklyn Museum of Art, Carnegie Museum of Art, Corcoran Gallery in Washington D.C., Metropolitan Museum of Art, Pennsylvania Academy of Fine Arts and Whitney Museum of American Art.

Works

Landscape mural study for the Cornelia Post Office (1938), tempera on paperboard held by the Smithsonian American Art Museum after a transfer from the Internal Revenue Service through the General Services Administration

Aspects of the American Industrial Scene, a mural study for U.S. Department of Labor (1937) tempera on paperboard. At the Smithsonian American Art Museum after transfer from the General Services Administration
Coal Yard and River
Construction, Power, and Transportation (1938) at U.S. Customs and Immigration (formerly Department of Labor)

References

1902 births
1964 deaths
20th-century American painters
American male painters
People from Niagara Falls, New York
Painters from New York (state)
20th-century American male artists
Section of Painting and Sculpture artists
Treasury Relief Art Project artists